Aulnay is a commune in the Vienne department in the Nouvelle-Aquitaine region in central-western France.

See also
 Communes of the Vienne department

References

Communes of Vienne